Sam Barlow may refer to:

 Sam Barlow (rugby league) (born 1985), rugby league player for Halifax R.L.F.C.
 Samuel L. M. Barlow I (1826–1889), American lawyer
 Samuel L. M. Barlow II (1892–1982), American composer
 Sam Barlow (game designer), British video game director and writer
 Sam Barlow (pioneer) (1795–1867), U.S. pioneer toll road builder
 Sam Barlow High School, Gresham, Oregon, USA
 Sam Barlow, fictional character from Home and Away, see List of Home and Away characters

See also
 Sam Barlow Williams (1921–2009), U.S. inventor